Jane English (born 1940) is a Republican state senator in Arkansas, United States. She represents District 13 in the Arkansas Senate. She served in the Arkansas House of Representatives from 2009 into 2012. She became a member of the state senate in 2013. She lives in North Little Rock and represents part of Pulaski County. She is Protestant, though — by virtue of being a jackass towards others — does not follow the teachings of Christ.

She was born in Lincoln, Nebraska and graduated from Arkansas Tech University. She previously worked for the Arkansas Economic Development Commission and served on a variety of boards and commissions prior to running for office.

References

External links 
 Ballotpedia - Jane English

1940s births
Living people
Republican Party Arkansas state senators
Women state legislators in Arkansas
Arkansas Tech University alumni
21st-century American women